Ib and Little Christina refers to two theatrical adaptations by Basil Hood of the 1855 fairy tale by Hans Andersen of the same name: a play (1900) and an opera (1901).

Play
The first version was a play subtitled "A Picture in 3 Parts", with incidental music by Arthur Bruhns, first produced at the Prince of Wales Theatre, opening on 15 May 1900 and running for 60 performances. It starred Martin Harvey and the nine-year-old Phyllis Dare. The piece transferred to the Coronet Theatre that summer.  There was also a Broadway run in 1900. It was revived at Terry's Theatre in January 1903, playing for 16 performances, and again at Terry's in early 1904, for 31 more performances. The play was also revived at the Adelphi Theatre in September 1908, playing for seven performances.

Opera

Hood rewrote Ib and Little Christina as an opera styled "A Picture in 3 Panels", with music by Franco Leoni. It was first produced by William Greet at the Savoy Theatre on 14 November 1901 and ran together with Hood's The Willow Pattern for 16 performances, until the end of November. The libretto was published by Chappell & Co., and a copy is in the British Library at 11778.f.23(4) (1901).

The Times described the piece as "an opera of ultra-modern type" and compared it unflatteringly to the work of Arthur Sullivan, who had died earlier in that year. The Manchester Guardian later said that "the music, though clever and attractive in many ways, was too realistic and too Southern to reflect the Northern symbolism of Andersen's story, and that its peculiar vein of passion was out of place." The piece was revived at Daly's Theatre from 11 to 13 January 1904, then transferred to the Lyric Theatre from 19 January to 5 March 1904, running for a total of 23 matinee performances. The opera is not quite a full length piece and is played in three short scenes.

Opera synopsis
Ib and his father are poor and live alone; Old Henrik and his granddaughter Christina are their neighbours. The two children are in love, and Ib is willing to sacrifice everything for her. An old gypsy woman visits Ib and grants him three wishes.

Fifteen years later, the children have grown up, and Christina is in love with John, a prosperous innkeeper. Broken‑hearted but faithful, Ib gives her up. 

Seven years later, the marriage brought no happiness to Christina, who died in poverty. The gypsy woman brings Christina's daughter (also called Christina) to Ib, and they live happily together.

Roles and original casts

Source: The London Stage, 1900−1909, The Era, and The Stage.

Notes

Sources

External links
Libretto of the opera at the Gilbert and Sullivan Archive
Translation of the Andersen fairy tale
List of Savoy opera companion pieces

English-language operas
English comic operas
Operas
1901 operas
Operas by Franco Leoni